(Triangle) is a 2010 Japanese film directed by Keisuke Yoshida. It was released on 26 June 2010.

Cast
 Sousuke Takaoka as Momose
 Erena Ono as Momo
 Tomoko Tabata as Kayo
 Yuko Oshima

References

External links
Official website 

2010 films
2010s Japanese-language films
Films directed by Keisuke Yoshida
2010s Japanese films